Caquetá Department is a department of Colombia. Located in the Amazonas region, Caquetá borders with the departments of Cauca and Huila to the west, the department of Meta to the north, the department of Guaviare to the northeast, the department of Vaupés to the east, the departments of Amazonas and Putumayo to the south covering a total area of 88,965 km², the third largest in the country. Its capital is the city of Florencia.

Municipalities

 Albania
 Belén de Andaquies
 Cartagena del Chairá
 Curillo
 El Doncello
 El Paujil
 Florencia
 La Montañita
 Milán
 Morelia
 Puerto Rico
 San José del Fragua
 San Vicente del Caguán
 Solano
 Solita
 Valparaíso

See also 
 Caquetá Territory

References

External links
 Government of Caquetá official website
 Secretary of Health of Caquetá
 Portal de información recreativa y cultural de Florencia y el Departamento del Caquetá.
Territorial-Environmental Information System of Colombian Amazon SIAT-AC website 
 Portal Positivo del Caquetá
 Clasificados del Caquetá

 
Departments of Colombia
States and territories established in 1982